Blackfield is an English pop band

Blackfield may also refer to:
Blackfield, Hampshire
Blackfield & Langley F.C.
Blackfield (album)

See also
Black Field (2009 Canadian film), 2009 Canadian historical drama film
Black Field (2009 Greek film)